Colomba Ithaliya is a Sri Lankan comedy-drama television series, broadcast on Independent Television Network. It is directed by Jayaprakash Sivagurunathan, produced by Sudharma Jayawardhana and written by Nilantha Perera. It airs every weekday from 9:00 pm to 9:30 pm onwards. The series started on 31 May 2021. It has received negative reviews from critics, particularly on screenplay and performances.

Cast and Characters

Main cast 

 Shanudrie Priyasad as Andrea
 Sampath Jayaweera as Chandana
 Chanuka Prabuddha as Sulalitha
 Anuradha Edirisinghe as Priyanwada aka Princy
 Gayathri Dias as Asha Balasuriya
 Lal Kularatne
 Janak Premalal
 Ananda athukorala
 Nilmini Kottegoda

Supporting cast 

 Udeni Nadika
 Rohan Wijetunga
 Madushan Nanayakkara
 Nethalie Nanayakkara
 Amaya Wijesooriya
 Kavinda Madushan
 Rathna Sumanapala
 Dayasiri Hettiarachchi
 Gamini Jayalath
 Dev Surendra

Minor cast 

 Aloka Sampath
 Janet Anthony
 Kulasiri Mallikarachchi
 Ranjan Suriyakumara
 Ananda S. Kapuge
 Kumuduni Adikari
 Dayananda Dewage
 Ranjith Kadupitiya
 Nilantha Mahawewa
 Pabasara Sulochana
 Upul Gunawardena
 Indika Madurage
 Dimuthu Jayasinghe
 Anura Weerasinghe

See also
ITN

References 

2021 Sri Lankan television series debuts
Sri Lankan television shows
Independent Television Network original programming